A pomander, from French pomme d'ambre, i.e., apple of amber, is a ball made for perfumes, such as ambergris (hence the name), musk, or civet. The pomander was worn or carried in a vase, also known by the same name, as a protection against infection in times of pestilence or merely as a useful article to modify bad smells. The globular cases which contained the pomanders were hung from a neck-chain or belt, or attached to the girdle, and were usually perforated in a variety of openwork techniques, and made of gold or silver. Sometimes they contained several partitions, in each of which was placed a different perfume.

The term "pomander" can refer to the scented material itself or to the container that contains such material. The container could be made of gold or silver and eventually evolved to be shaped like nuts, skulls, hearts, books and ships. Smaller versions were made to be attached by a chain to a finger ring and held in the hand. Even smaller versions served as cape buttons or rosary beads.

A pomander can be a bag containing fragrant herbs and might be viewed as an early form of aromatherapy. Pomanders can be considered related to censers, in which aromatics are burned or roasted rather than naturally evaporated.

History
Pomanders were first mentioned in literature in the mid-thirteenth century. They were used in the late Middle Ages through the 17th century.
Also a version of the pomander with oranges, cloves, oils, and a golden ribbon may be used as a recovery charm in witchcraft.

Medieval
Pomanders were first made for carrying as religious keepsakes.

Renaissance
A recipe for making pomander was included in John Partridge's The Treasury of Commodious Conceits, and Hidden Secrets (London, 1586):

Nostradamus
Michel de Nostredame had a similar method and formula using similar ingredients, but a rather different procedure.

"Rose tablets" were made by soaking a pound of roses without the flower heads in deer musk water overnight. The water was then thoroughly squeezed out and the roses ground with seven ounces of benzoin, a quarter of ambergris and another of civet musk. This mixture was made into tablets, which were each sandwiched between rose petals and dried in a cool, dark area

To form the final pomander, two ounces of the purest labdanum, an ounce each of Styrax calamites and benzoin resin, half an ounce of the rose tablets, one ounce of violet powder, and half a dram each ambergris and musk were ground into a powder and kneaded with the rose-musk water from the production of the rose tablets. This produced "an aromatic ball of the most supreme perfume, and the longest-lasting that can be made anywhere in the world."

Pouncet box
In the late 16th century the pouncet box appeared which, whilst retaining the traditional features of the pomander, was designed to hold liquid perfumes, blended with powder and absorbed on a sponge or piece of cotton. It was favoured by the upper classes who appreciated the delicacy of the liquid perfumes. Its name stemmed from the fact that the box was "pounced" or pierced to release the scent.

Modern

One modern style of pomander is made by studding an orange or other fruit with whole dried cloves and letting it cure dry, after which it may last many, many years. This modern pomander serves the functions of perfuming and freshening the air and also of keeping drawers of clothing and linens fresh, pleasant-smelling, and moth-free.

Ingredients
Other ingredients in the process of making pomanders are:

 Agarwood
 Ambergris
 Benzoin resin
 Calamus
 Camphor
 Cinnamon
 Civet (perfumery)
 Cloves
 Gum arabic
 Labdanum
 Lavender
 Mace
 Marjoram
 Musk
 Nutmeg
 Orris root
 Rose oil
 Rosemary
 Scented water
 Spikenard
 Styrax
 Tragacanth
 Vietnamese Balm

Culture
A pomander is worn by Rosemary Woodhouse, in Roman Polanski's 1968 film, Rosemary's Baby. It figures as a central part of the plot development.

The pouncet box is mentioned in Shakespeare's Henry IV Part I when Hotspur is accused of withholding Scottish nobles captured in a skirmish and in self-defence pleads, in describing the King's messenger:

He was perfumèd like a milliner,
And ’twixt his finger and his thumb he held
A pouncet box, which ever and anon
He gave his nose and took't away again,
Who therewith angry, when it next came there,
Took it in snuff; and still he smiled and talked.

Etymology
Medieval pomander paste formulas usually contained ambergris. From this came "pomme ambre" (amber apple) and from there the word pomander was developed. Other names for the pomander are Ambraapfel, Bisamapfel, Bisamknopf, Bisambüchse, balsam apple, Desmerknopf, musk ball Desmerapfel, Oldanokapsel, Pisambüchse, and smelling apple.

Gallery

See also
Sachet (scented bag)

References

Sources
 Boeser, Knut, The elixirs of Nostradamus: Nostradamus' original recipes for elixirs, scented water, beauty potions, and sweetmeats, Moyer Bell, 1996; 
 Groom, Nigel, The new perfume handbook, Springer, 1997, 
 Longman, Rrown, The Archaeological journal, Volume 31, Green and Longman 1874
 Madden, Frederic, Privy purse expenses of the Princess Mary, daughter of King Henry the Eighth, afterwards Queen Mary, W. Pickering 1831
 Schleif, Corine and Volker Schier,  Katerina's Windows: Donation and Devotion, Art and Music, as Heard and Seen Through the Writings of a Birgittine Nun, University Park: Penn State Press, 2009, 237, 242-244, 

Attribution

External links

 Bisamapfel detailed function of medieval pomander in German. Use Google Translate for English.
 Medieval & Renaissance Pomanders 14th–17th century pomanders in museums
 17th century pomander Wartski, London
 How To Make Pomanders
 Watches in Pomanders from 1500 to 1550
 Peter Henlein: Pomander Watch Anno 1505

Perfumery